In enzymology, a gallate 1-beta-glucosyltransferase is an enzyme that catalyzes the chemical reaction

UDP-glucose + gallate  UDP + 1-galloyl-beta-D-glucose

Thus, the two substrates of this enzyme are UDP-glucose and gallate, whereas its two products are UDP and 1-galloyl-beta-D-glucose.

This enzyme belongs to the family of glycosyltransferases, specifically the hexosyltransferases.  The systematic name of this enzyme class is UDP-glucose:gallate beta-D-glucosyltransferase. Other names in common use include UDP-glucose-vanillate 1-glucosyltransferase, UDPglucose:vanillate 1-O-glucosyltransferase, and UDPglucose:gallate glucosyltransferase.

References 

 
 

EC 2.4.1
Enzymes of unknown structure
Phenolic acids metabolism